1985 was a year. 
1985 may also refer to:

Literature
 1985 (Burgess novel), a 1978 novel by Anthony Burgess
 1985 (Dalos novel), a 1983 novel by György Dalos
 Marvel 1985, a Marvel Comics mini-series

Music
 The 1985, a noise rock band
 Nineteen85, a Canadian music producer

Albums
 MCMLXXXV (album), an album by Rufio
 1985 (album), by Enuff Z'nuff

Songs
 "1985" (J. Cole song), a song by J. Cole from KOD
 "1985" (SR-71 song), a song by SR-71 and later popular for its rendition by Bowling for Soup
 "1985", a single by The Blue Hearts
 "1985", a song by Carcass from Surgical Steel
 "1985", a song by Haken from Affinity
 "1985", a song by The Huntingtons from High School Rock
 "1985", a song by Manic Street Preachers from Lifeblood
 "1985", a song by Pseudo Echo from Teleporter
 "1985", a song by Bo Burnham from The Inside Outtakes
 "Nineteen Hundred and Eighty-Five", a song by Paul McCartney and Wings
 "Lifted Up (1985)", a song by Passion Pit from Kindred

Film, television and radio
 1985 (film), a 2018 film
 Argentina, 1985, a 2022 film
 1985A, a fictional timeline from Back to the Future
 "1985", a 1955 episode of the radio comedy The Goon Show parodying George Orwell's Nineteen Eighty-Four

Other uses
 1985 Hopmann, the asteroid #1985
 M1985 pistol (Model 1985), 9mm semi-automatic Beretta

See also

 
 
 85 (disambiguation)